Don Bosco Preparatory High School (Don Bosco Prep) is a private, all-boys Roman Catholic high school from ninth through twelfth grades. Founded in 1915 as a boarding school for Polish boys, by the Salesians of Don Bosco, a religious community of priests and brothers, the school is situated on a  campus in Ramsey, in Bergen County, New Jersey, United States. The school is operated under the supervision of the Roman Catholic Archdiocese of Newark.

As of the 2019–20 school year, the school had an enrollment of 790 students and 52 classroom teachers (on an FTE basis), for a student–teacher ratio of 15.2:1. The school's student body was 49.2% (389) White, 18.4% (145) Black, 12.8% (101) two or more races, 11.0% (87) Hispanic, 4.3% (34) Native Hawaiian / Pacific Islander, 4.2% (33) Asian and 0.1% (1) American Indian / Alaska Native.

History
The school dates back to April 1915, when it was created as a boarding school for boys from Poland.

In its early years, from 1915 to 1973, Don Bosco housed resident students on the upper floors of St. Johns Hall. Freshmen were in the center wing while upperclassmen stayed on the top floor in the north annex. During the 1960s, approximately 75 or 10% of the students lived on campus. Resident students attended Mass each morning and were allowed to go home each weekend starting around 1963. Prior to that, weekend home visits were periodic.

Accreditation 
The school has been accredited by the Middle States Association of Colleges and Schools since 1960. Don Bosco Prep is a member of the Association for Supervision and Curriculum Development, the National Catholic Educational Association, the National Association of Secondary School Principals, the National Honor Society and the New Jersey State Interscholastic Athletic Association.

Course offerings
Courses available include:

Mathematics 
Algebra I (College Prep, Honors)
Geometry (College Prep, Honors, Advanced Honors)
Algebra II/Trigonometry (College Prep, Honors)
Pre-Calculus (College Prep, Honors)
Statistics, 
AP Calculus AB and BC

Literature
Composition and Literature (College Prep, Honors)
American Literature (College Prep, Honors)
British Literature (College Prep, Honors)
AP English Language and Composition
AP English Literature and Composition
World Literature
Creative Writing
Journalisms 
Public Speaking

World languages
Latin
Italian
Spanish
Mandarin Chinese
AP Spanish Language
Social Studies 
World History (College Prep, Honors)
AP United States History (College Prep, Honors)
AP European History
AP United States Government and Politics
AP Psychology
Economics
Criminal Justice
Intro to Law
Sociology

Sciences
Biology (College Prep, Honors)
Chemistry (College Prep, Honors)
Physics (College Prep, Honors)
AP Biology
AP Chemistry
AP Physics 1 and 2
Anatomy and Physiology (College Prep, Honors)
Independent Science Research H I
Sports Medicine

Theology
Catholic Morality
Theology of the Body
Hebrew Scripture
New Testament Scripture
Catholic Sacraments
Catholic Social Teachings
Theology of Marriage
Philosophy

Fine arts
AP Studio Art
Musical Arts

Computer sciences
Computer Applications
Web Design
Visual BASIC
AP Computer Science
3-D Animation
3-D Modeling
Animation

Engineering
Intro. to Robotics 
Robotics Engineering
Robotics Design
Robotics Project
Engineering Design

Business
Business Law
Economics (College Prep, Honors)
Financial Literacy
Leadership, Entrepreneurship, and Opportunity Program I
Leadership, Entrepreneurship, and Opportunity Program II
Principles of Accounting 
Principles of Accounting/Finance
Principles of Marketing

Athletics
The Don Bosco Ironmen compete in the Big North Conference, which is comprised of public and private high schools in Bergen and Passaic counties, and was established by the New Jersey State Interscholastic Athletic Association (NJSIAA) following a reorganization of sports leagues in Northern New Jersey. With 1,278 students in grades 10–12, the school was classified by the NJSIAA for the 2019–20 school year as Non-Public A for most athletic competition purposes, which included schools with an enrollment of 381 to 1,454 students in that grade range (equivalent to Group IV for public schools). In the 2009–10 school year, the school competed in the North Jersey Tri-County Conference, which was established on an interim basis to facilitate realignment. Until the NJSIAA's 2009 realignment, the school had participated in Division C of the Northern New Jersey Interscholastic League, which included high schools located in Bergen County, Essex County and Passaic County, and was separated into three divisions based on NJSIAA size classification. The football team competes in the United Red division of the North Jersey Super Football Conference, which includes 112 schools competing in 20 divisions, making it the nation's biggest football-only high school sports league. The school was classified by the NJSIAA as Non-Public Group IV for football for 2018–2020.

The athletic teams are nicknamed the Ironmen and the school colors are maroon and white. In 2008 they were ranked as the number nine sports program in the nation by Sports Illustrated.

  
The school was the Group A winner of the NJSIAA ShopRite Cup in 2006–07. The award recognized the school for achieving a tie for third in boys' soccer, first in boys' cross country, first in football, second in wrestling, second in boys' indoor track and field relays, a tie for third in baseball, second in boys' golf, a tie for third in boys' lacrosse and second in boys' track and field.

Fall
The school fields football, soccer and cross country teams in the fall.

Cross country
The cross country team won its first New Jersey State Meets of Champions in 1992 under the leadership of Coach Tony Monks and Bill Barry and returned as Champions in 2007 and 2009. The team won Non-Public A titles in four consecutive years from 2006 to 2009, and again in 2015. The Ironmen placed third at the Nike Northeast Regional Race, and placed 10th at Nike Team Nationals in Portland, Oregon in 2007. They ended Christian Brothers Academy's 11-year winning streak at the state group championships with their string of four wins, and in 2005 the freshman cross country team ended the 19-year streak of CBA in the NJCTCs. The squad finished sixth in the country at Nike Cross Nationals in 2008. The Ironmen were the best team not to make nationals in 2009, finishing 23rd in the country. Under the guidance of head coach Kevin Kilduff, the program was named North Jersey's "Program of the Decade" for 2000–2009.

Soccer
The soccer team were state runners-up in 2009 and are a perennial competitor for the state title. In 2009, they defeated Bergen Catholic High School in the Bergen County Tournament final 3–0, behind goals from Dylan Renna, Gio Esposito and Ryan McNamara. The Bergen County Coaches Association named Don Bosco's Ian Joyce and Steve Franchini to its All Decade Team, but selected Ramapo High School in 2010 as its Program of the Decade, despite both teams having won five championships in the ten-year span, citing the fact that Ramapo had beaten Don Bosco three of the four times the teams had played each other in the county championship.

Football
The school's football program has been a perennial contender for the New Jersey State Interscholastic Athletic Association Non-Public Group IV championship. The Ironmen have won 15 state championships, were declared winners in 1968, 1970 and 1973, and won playoff tournaments in Non-Public A North in 1983, 1984 and 1990, and in Non-Public Group IV in 2002, 2003, 2006–2011 and 2015.

The 1984 team won the Parochial A North sectional title by defeating Bergen Catholic High School by a score of 15–0 in the championship game, after having beaten Bergen Catholic 13–0 on Thanksgiving, making it the first time Bergen Catholic had been shutout in consecutive games in more than two decades.

The 1990 team finished the season with an 8–3 record after overcoming a 20-0 halftime deficit to win the Non-Public A North title with a 21–20 win against Queen of Peace High School in the championship game.

Prior to achieving National Champion status, the Don Bosco football team ended the 2002 season ranked No. 8 in the nation in USA Todays "Super 25" ranking of the best high school football teams in the country, was ranked No. 2 in the nation in the 2003 season and ranked No. 7 in the 2006 season.  The team finished first overall in USA Todays regional rankings for the East at the end of those same three seasons.

In 2002, 2003, 2006 and 2010 the football team won the Star Ledger Trophy as the newspaper's top-ranked program in the New Jersey.

On September 27, 2008, the nationally ranked football team traveled to California, where they defeated De La Salle High School 23–21 on national television, the winning margin coming with 10 seconds left on a 19-yard field goal.  A year later Don Bosco hosted De La Salle, defeating them 30–6 on September 12, 2009.  Later that year the Ironmen travelled to Prattville, Alabama, to take on another nationally ranked team. That game was televised nationwide by ESPN. The Ironmen won 35–24.  Don Bosco finished the season with a perfect 12–0 record and, following a number of weeks ranked second in the nation, was chosen 2009 National Champion when 2008 National Champion Saint Thomas Aquinas of Fort Lauderdale, Florida lost in the Florida State semi-finals. In 2009 the Ironmen became the first New Jersey team to be selected as the High School Football National Champion, finishing atop the lists of both the USA Today and the National Prep Poll rankings.  Don Bosco repeated in 2011 as the National Champion of both the USA Today and the National Prep Poll.

The team won the Non-Public B title in 2015, defeating Saint Joseph Regional High School by a score of 21–10 to win the program's first title in four years.

Bosco has sent more than 200 football players to Division I colleges across the country.

The rivalry with Saint Joseph Regional High School was listed at 15th on NJ.com's 2017 list "Ranking the 31 fiercest rivalries in N.J. HS football". Don Bosco leads the rivalry with a 30–23 overall record as of 2017, which includes periods in the 1990s and 2010s when the two schools played each other on Thanksgiving. The rivalry with Bergen Catholic High School, dating back to 1958, was listed as the state's number-one rivalry, with Don Bosco in the lead at 38-28-2.

Winter

Basketball
The basketball Ironmen won the Non-Public A state championship in 1944 (defeating Camden Catholic High School in the tournament final), 1966 (vs. Christian Brothers Academy), 1968 (vs. Trenton Cathedral High School), 1970 (vs. Christian Brothers), 2017 (vs. St. Augustine Preparatory School) and 2018 (vs. Camden Catholic).

The 1966 team ended the year with a record of 25-2 after winning the Parochial A state championship at Convention Hall in Atlantic City with a 65–58 win in the tournament final against a Christian Brothers Academy team that had beaten them in the finals the previous season.

The 1968 team won the Parochial A title at Convention Hall with a 75–71 defeat of a Trenton Cathedral team that entered the championship game with a 26–0 record.

The team won the Parochial A title in 1970 with an 83–71 win in the championship game against Christian Brothers in a game played at Atlantic City's Convention Hall.

After a 47-year drought, the team won the 2017 Non-Public A title with a 69–66 win against St. Augustine. The Ironmen would repeat as Non-Public A state champions in 2018, defeating Camden Catholic High School by a score of 61–54 in the tournament final played at the RWJBarnabas Health Arena.

Bowling
The bowling team won the overall state championship in 1991 and 1993. The team took the 1991 title with a total score of 2,875 pins.

Ice hockey
The hockey team dates back to the 1960s.  The team currently plays in the Gordon Conference. Frequently ranked among the top five teams in the state, the Ironmen have been to two state championships, and won the 2012 Gordon Conference Championship, four Bergen County championships, a Van Cott Cup and numerous other championships.  Coach Greg Toskos, the all-time leading scorer at Don Bosco, has led the Ironmen since the 2006–07 season (his first two seasons as co-coach) and has a career 116-79-23 record.

Swimming
The swimming program was introduced in 2005. On January 5, 2008, Don Bosco swim team defeated Bergen Catholic High School, 98–72.  It was Bergen Catholic's first dual meet loss in 23 years.

Fencing
The fencing team in the 2011–2012 season got second place in Section 4 district championships and was undefeated, going 13–0.

In the 2012-2013 fencing season, the Ironmen were again undefeated in District 4 dual meets, placed second in the District 4 tournament, and, for the first time in team history, advanced past the first round of the State Tournament to achieve a ranking of sixth in the state.

Indoor track and field
The indoor track team and field team has risen to national prominence in the past few years, as the Ironman quartet of Steven Wexler, Jason Baker, Conor Sullivan and anchor leg Sharif Webb won the National Championship in the 3200m (4 × 800 m) relay at the 2006 National Scholastic Indoor Championships held in New York City. Four years later at the NSIC, the 2010 4x1 mile relay, led by an astonishing anchor from Michael Belgiovine (and also including Rafael Vargas, Howard Rosas and Phelan McCormack) earned second team All-American status for their runner-up finish in that race. In addition, the Ironmen have won County championships indoors for five consecutive years and have won numerous league/conference and invitational titles. The team captured the NJSIAA Non-Public "A" State Title at the Bennett Indoor Complex in Toms River, NJ. The program was named "Program of the Decade" by the Bergen County Coaches Association.

Wrestling
The wrestling team won the 2007 Non-Public North A state sectional championship with a 32–28 win against rival Bergen Catholic High School.

Razohnn Gross became the school's first individual wrestling champion when he won the 2012 title at 195 pounds in overtime against Eric McMullen of North Bergen High School. Gross won his second title in 2013 with a victory over Anthony Messner of Franklin High School. That same year, 2013, Luis Gonzalez became Don Bosco's second individual state champion when he earned first place at 113 pounds.

Spring 
The school offers seven varsity sports in the spring season including baseball, golf, lacrosse, track & field, tennis, crew and volleyball.

The lacrosse, golf, and volleyball teams are teams on the rise. The golf team finished undefeated in 2009 and was ranked within the top five teams in the state.

Outdoor track and field
The Ironmen are six-time state champions in Spring track with wins in 1955, 1961, and 2006, and three consecutive titles in 2009, 2010, and 2011. The track team has won county championships for several years running, and won many league and conference titles in the now-defunct NNJIL before joining the Big North Conference. In 2007 the Sprint Medley Relay (Jason Kelsey, Matthew Cato, Marvin Whilby and Sharif Webb) captured a national title at the Nike Outdoor Nationals held in Greensboro, North Carolina. In 2009, the 4x1 mile relay team earned All-American status with a fifth-place finish at the Nike Outdoor Nationals. The shuttle hurdle relay team, 4 × 400 m relay team and javelin thrower Tyler Yee medalled at the New Balance Outdoor Nationals in June 2011. Don Bosco Prep has become one of the elite high school track and field programs in the nation, culminating in an eighth-place finish at the Nike Track Nationals, held in Eugene, Oregon in June 2011.

The team was voted as "Program of the Decade" for 2000-2009 by the Records track reporter, Paul Schwartz. Head Coach Rob DeCarlo Jr. was named "Coach of the Decade" for his efforts in leading the team since 2003, ending a 45-year state title drought in 2006. DeCarlo was honored as New Jersey Boys' Track "Coach of the Year" by The Star-Ledger in June 2011.

Baseball
The baseball team has won the county title nine times since 2000 and the state championship six times; the team won the Non-Public A North title in 1963 and won the State Non-Public A championship in 1979 (vs. Notre Dame High School), 1986 (vs. Red Bank Catholic High School), 1988 (vs. Holy Cross Preparatory Academy), 1989 (vs. St. Joseph High School of Metuchen), 1994 (vs. Monsignor Donovan High School) and 2008 (vs. Christian Brothers Academy).

The team finished with a record of 15–11 in 1989 after winning the Parochial A title with a 3–1 defeat of St. Joseph of Metuchen, behind the pitching of future MLB pitcher C. J. Nitkowski.

The 1994 team defeated Monsignor Donovan by a score of 1–0 in the championship game to win the Parochial A state title and finish the season 21–9. The 2008 squad posted a record of 33-0 and won the Non-Public A state championship, and were ranked No. 1 in the nation by ESPNHS50 and No. 2 by USA Today. Former MLB pitcher Mike Stanton coached the team in 2010 before stepping down. In 2011 they went 25-1 and were 18th in the nation, according to MaxPreps Xcellent 25. In 2012 Don Bosco was pre-ranked at No. 6 in the nation by MaxPrepsand finished the season 26–4.

Rowing
The rowing team has won two Scholastic Rowing Association of America National championships and two Stotesbury Cup gold medals. They have at one point possessed the title in every men's sculling category. The rowing team has only competed against Bergen Catholic High School once during the spring sprint season, in the Junior Quad head race qualifier at the 2010 Stotesbury Cup Regatta. In 2012 the varsity double (Aaron McAvey and Brian Sullivan) won the SRAA national championships. In 2017 the coxed lightweight four won the SRAA national championships under Coach Scott Menken.

Lacrosse
The boys' lacrosse team won the Non-Public A state championship in 2013, defeating Seton Hall Prep in the tournament final.

Activities and clubs
Don Bosco Prep offers clubs and activities for student involvement, both on and off-campus:

Academic
 Chess Club
 Computer Club
 Creative Writing Club
 Debate Team
 French Club
 German Culture Club
 Health Occupations Students of America
 Italian Club
 Junior Statesmen of America
 Latin Club
 Math Team
 Mock Trial
 Model UN
 Robotics Team
 Spanish Club

Arts
 Art Club
 Bagpipe & Drum Corp
 Chapel Concert Series 
 Concert Band 
 Concert Choir 
 Drama Club
 Liturgical Music Group 
 Stage Crew
 String Orchestra

Athletic 
 Frisbee Team
 Intramurals
 Outdoors Club
 Ping Pong Club
 Ski and Snowboard Club

Catholic and service 
 Habitat for Humanity (Youth United)
 Mission Club 
 Pro-Life Club
 Students Against Destructive Decisions (SADD)
 Theology of the Body Club 
 Youth Ministry Program

Honor societies
 Latin Honor Society
 English Honor Society 
 French Honor Society 
 German Honor Society 
 Italian Honor Society 
 Math Honor Society 
 National Honor Society 
 Science Honor Society 
 Spanish Honor Society

Publications
 Don Bosco Prep Magazine
 Literary Magazine
 Newspaper - Ironman
 Yearbook - Bosconian

Special interest
 Amnesty International
 Don Bosco Grilling Society
 Black Student Association
 DBP Ambassadors 
 Environmental Awareness 
 Irish American Culture Society
 Ironmen Fight Cancer
 LINK - Liberty in North Korea 
 MSG Varsity
 Peer Mediation
 Prom Committees
 Spectrum 
 Student Council 
 TV Club
 Wilderness Survival Club

Concert series
In order to raise awareness of the arts at Don Bosco Prep, the music department and alumni began a series of concerts.  Some feature religious or classical music and are included in the Mary, Help of Christians Chapel Concert Series.  Other concerts, organized by the alumni association, present more contemporary music.  Billed artists have included:

 Chanticleer, San Francisco all-male a cappella choir
 Liza Minnelli, winner of a Tony, Emmy, Oscar, and Grammy
 John Pizzarelli (who graduated in 1977) and Bucky Pizzarelli, jazz musicians
 Philip Smith, Principal Trumpeter of the New York Philharmonic
 Gordon Turk, concert organist
 Yale Whiffenpoofs, the oldest U.S. collegiate a cappella group

Notable alumni

 Matthew Bogdanos, New York City Assistant District Attorney and author of Thieves of Baghdad
 Clinton Calabrese (born 1986, class of 2004), politician who has represented the 36th Legislative District in the New Jersey General Assembly since 2018.
 Don Guardian (born 1953, class of 1971), politician who has represented the 2nd Legislative District in the New Jersey General Assembly since 2022.
 John Joseph O'Hara (born 1946), auxiliary bishop of the Roman Catholic Archdiocese of New York
 Jason Patric (born 1966 as Jason Patric Miller), actor, appeared in The Lost Boys and Sleepers
 John Pizzarelli (born 1960), jazz guitarist and singer
 Brandon Scoop B Robinson (born 1985), sports writer, radio host and television personality most notably with CBS Sports Radio.
 Don Van Natta Jr. (born 1964), Pulitzer Prize-winning journalist at The New York Times and ESPN; bestselling author of First Off the Tee 
 Alexander M. Zaleski (1906–1975), Bishop of Lansing from 1965 until his death

Athletes
 Jalen Berger, American football running back for the Michigan State Spartans football team.
 Leonte Carroo (born 1994), wide receiver for the Miami Dolphins
 Tommy DeVito, quarterback for the Illinois Fighting Illini football team.
 Mike Dietze (born 1989), professional soccer player who has played for the Philadelphia Fury of the American Soccer League
 Brian Gaine, American football executive who was the general manager of the Houston Texans from 2018 to 2019.
 Michael Ray Garvin (born 1986), former wide receiver for the Las Vegas Locomotives
 Joe Graf Jr. (born 1998), professional stock car racing driver who competes in the ARCA Menards Series.
 Ryan Grant (born 1982), former running back for the Green Bay Packers
 Ron Harper Jr. (born 2000), college basketball player for the Rutgers Scarlet Knights.
 Matt Hennessy (born 1997), offensive lineman for the Atlanta Falcons
 Thomas Hennessy (born 1994), long snapper for the New York Jets
 Ian Joyce (born 1985), goalkeeper for the Colorado Rapids who played professionally in England for Southend United
 Tommy McNamara (born 1991), professional soccer player who plays as a midfielder for New York City FC in Major League Soccer
 Al-Quadin Muhammad (born 1995), defensive end for the Indianapolis Colts of the National Football League.
 Patrick Murray (born 1991), placekicker for the Tampa Bay Buccaneers
 C. J. Nitkowski (born 1973), former MLB pitcher
 Gary Nova (born 1993), football quarterback.
 Jabrill Peppers (born 1995), strong safety and return specialist for the New York Giants of the NFL.
 Chris Port (born 1967), former NFL offensive lineman who played for five seasons for the New Orleans Saints.
 Matt Simms (born 1988), former quarterback at the University of Tennessee; son of former New York Giants' quarterback Phil Simms; signed by the Buffalo Bills
 Tommy Sweeney (born 1995), tight end for the Buffalo Bills.
 Mike Teel (born 1986), former record-setting quarterback at Rutgers University; drafted by the Seattle Seahawks; WR coach at Rutgers University
 Brian Toal (born 1985), former linebacker/fullback for the New York Jets of the NFL.
 Justin Trattou (born 1988), defensive end who played in the NFL for the New York Giants.
 Jason Vosler (born 1993), baseball third baseman for the San Francisco Giants.
 Corey Wootton (born 1987), former defensive end for the Chicago Bears, Minnesota Vikings and Detroit Lions; former defensive end at Northwestern University; became a 4th round draft pick of the Chicago Bears

References

External links 
Don Bosco Preparatory High School website
Data for Don Bosco Preparatory High School, National Center for Education Statistics
Don Bosco Athletics
Early illustration, Don Bosco Institute Ramsey, NJ

1915 establishments in New Jersey
Boys' schools in New Jersey
Educational institutions established in 1915
Middle States Commission on Secondary Schools
Private high schools in Bergen County, New Jersey
Ramsey, New Jersey
Roman Catholic Archdiocese of Newark
Catholic secondary schools in New Jersey
Salesian secondary schools